Dahakalikasthan is a village development committee in Doti District in the Seti Zone of western Nepal. At the time of the 1991 Nepal census it had a population of 1999 living in 362 individual households.

References

External links
UN map of the municipalities of Doti District

Populated places in Doti District